The Women's 400 m Freestyle race at the 2009 World Championships was held on 26 July at the Foro Italico in Rome, Italy.

Records

The following records were established during the competition:

Heats

Final

See also
Swimming at the 2007 World Aquatics Championships – Women's 400 metre freestyle
Swimming at the 2008 Summer Olympics – Women's 400 metre freestyle

External links
Worlds 2009 results: Women's 400m Free Prelims, from OmegaTiming.com (official timer of the 2009 Worlds); retrieved 2009-07-27.
Worlds 2009 results: Women's 400m Free Finals, from OmegaTiming.com (official timer of the 2009 Worlds); retrieved 2009-07-27.

Freestyle Women's 400 m
2009 in women's swimming